Pamela Tajonar Alonso (born 2 December 1984) is a Mexican professional footballer who plays as a goalkeeper for Spanish Primera División club Villarreal and the Mexico women's national team.

Club career

FC Indiana
Tajonar signed for FC Indiana.

Buffalo Flash
Tajonar played for the Buffalo Flash of the W-League twice, winning the title in 2010.

Atlético Málaga
Tajonar made her professional debut in the Spanish league for Atlético Málaga.

LdB Malmö
In 2011, she signed with Damallsvenskan champion LdB Malmö. She made two appearances for the team after Þóra Helgadóttir earned a red card. Following the end of the season she left Malmö, and next summer she returned to Spain, joining newly promoted Levante Las Planas, with which she played about half of the season's games.

Western New York Flash
On 11 January 2013 she signed for Western New York Flash as part of the NWSL Player Allocation for the inaugural season of the National Women's Soccer League. She started the season on the bench, behind Adrianna Franch.

Sevilla
Tajonar signed for Spanish Primera División club Sevilla in August 2014, after spending four months back in Mexico on a government-backed project to coach soccer to street children. Sevilla were relegated from the top division in 2014–15, but Tajonar decided to remain with the team for their Segunda División campaign.

International career
Tajonar is a member of the Mexico national team, having taken part in the 2004 Summer Olympics and the 2011 World Cup and 2015 World Cup as well as the 2003, 2007, 2011 and 2015 Pan American Games and the Gold Cup.

Honours

Club
LdB Malmö
 Damallsvenskan (1): 2011
 Svenska Supercupen: 2011

FC Barcelona
 Primera División: Winner, 2019-20
 UEFA Women's Champions League: Runner-up, 2018-19
 Supercopa Femenina: Winner, 2020
 Copa Catalunya: Winner, 2018, 2019

References

External links
 
 Profile  at Mexican Football Federation
 
 Western New York player profile

1984 births
Living people
Sportspeople from Cuernavaca
Mexican women's footballers
Footballers from Morelos
Women's association football goalkeepers
USL W-League (1995–2015) players
Women's Premier Soccer League players
Primera División (women) players
Málaga CF Femenino players
Damallsvenskan players
FC Rosengård players
National Women's Soccer League players
Western New York Flash players
Sevilla FC (women) players
Mexico women's international footballers
Footballers at the 2004 Summer Olympics
Olympic footballers of Mexico
2011 FIFA Women's World Cup players
Footballers at the 2011 Pan American Games
Pan American Games medalists in football
Pan American Games bronze medalists for Mexico
2015 FIFA Women's World Cup players
Footballers at the 2015 Pan American Games
Mexican expatriate women's footballers
Mexican expatriate sportspeople in the United States
Expatriate women's soccer players in the United States
Mexican expatriate sportspeople in Spain
Expatriate women's footballers in Spain
Expatriate women's footballers in Sweden
F.C. Indiana players
FC Barcelona Femení players
Medalists at the 2015 Pan American Games
EdF Logroño players
Villarreal CF (women) players
FC Levante Las Planas players
Mexican footballers